Kamonporn Sukmak (RTGS: Kamonphon Sukmak, born February 29, 1988) is a member of the Thailand women's national volleyball team.

Career
Kamonporn played the 2010 Club World Championship and ranked in fifth place with Federbrau and she also played the 2011 Club World Championship with Chang and also ranked fifth.

Clubs
  Federbrau (2008-2009)
  Chang (2010-2011)
  Sisaket-Narathiwat (2011-2013)
  Suansunantha VC (2013-2014)
  Rattana Bundit University (2014-2015)

Awards

Individual
 2003 Asian Youth Championship "Best Setter"
 2006 Thailand League "Best Setter"

Clubs
 2011 Asian Club Championship -  Champion with Chang

National team
 2008 Asian Cup Championship -  Bronze Medal
 2009 Asian Championship -  Gold Medal
 2010 Asian Cup Championship -  Silver Medal

References

 

Kamonporn Sukmak
Living people
1988 births
Volleyball players at the 2010 Asian Games
Kamonporn Sukmak
Kamonporn Sukmak
Southeast Asian Games medalists in volleyball
Competitors at the 2009 Southeast Asian Games
Competitors at the 2011 Southeast Asian Games
Kamonporn Sukmak
Kamonporn Sukmak
Kamonporn Sukmak